was a pseudonymous Japanese fetish artist best known for his works depicting female domination ("femdom"). Common subjects and motifs of his art include erotic asphyxiation, facesitting, voluptuous women, and men being used as human furniture.

Biography
Harukawa was born in 1947 in Osaka Prefecture, Japan. He developed a career as a fetish artist in the 1960s and 1970s, taking the pen name "Namio Harukawa": formed from an anagram of "Naomi", a reference to Jun'ichirō Tanizaki's novel of the same name, and the last name of actress Masumi Harukawa. Though he worked in pornographic magazines for the majority of his career, his work received wider recognition and critical acclaim beginning in the 2000s. His art has earned praise from Oniroku Dan, Shūji Terayama, and Madonna, and favorable comparisons to works by Robert Crumb.

His artwork typically features women with large breasts, hips, legs, and buttocks dominating and humiliating smaller men, typically through facesitting or other forms of sexualized smothering. Bondage and human furniture are depicted frequently in his art.

Kyonyū Katsuai, a two-volume book of Harukawa's works, has been published in Japan. Two volumes of works by Harukawa have been published by French publishing house : Callipyge in 2009, the first book of works by Harukawa published outside of Japan, and Maxi Cula in 2012. Works by Harukawa were exhibited at the Museum of Eroticism in Paris in 2013, his first solo exhibition outside of Japan. The exhibition featured 71 works by Harukawa, 59 of which were from his Garden of Domina series. The Incredible Femdom Art of Namio Harukawa, an anthology of Harukawa's works, was published by Kawade Shobō Shinsha in 2019.

Harukawa died on April 24, 2020. His death was confirmed in a blog post by Yuko Kitagawa, the owner of a video production company with longstanding ties to Harukawa.

References

Further reading
 Harukawa, Namio. Garden of Domina: An Illustrated Story. Pottoshuppan, 2012.
 Harukawa, Namio. The Incredible Femdom Art of Namio Harukawa. Kawade Shobō Shinsha, 2019.

1947 births
2020 deaths
BDSM people
Bondage artists
Fetish artists
Japanese erotic artists
Japanese illustrators
Pseudonymous artists
Artists from Osaka Prefecture